The Encompass Championship was a golf tournament on the Champions Tour. It was played for the first time in 2013 at the North Shore Country Club in Glenview, Illinois.

The purse for the 2013 tournament was $1,800,000, with $270,000 going to the winner.

Winners

External links

Coverage on Champions Tour official site

Former PGA Tour Champions events
Golf in Illinois